Cyprus participated at the 2018 Summer Youth Olympics in Buenos Aires, Argentina from 6 October to 18 October 2018.

Athletics

Boys
Field events

Dancesport

Cyprus qualified one dancer based on its performance at the 2018 World Youth Breaking Championship.

Gymnastics

Rhythmic
Cyprus qualified one rhythmic gymnast based on its performance at the European qualification event.

Multidiscipline

Judo

Individual

Team

Swimming

Girls

*Alexandra Schegoleva's heat time was tied with 2 other swimmers in 16th place, which led to a swim-off for the last qualification spot. She finished third, therefore 18th overall.

References

2018 in Cypriot sport
Nations at the 2018 Summer Youth Olympics
Cyprus at the Youth Olympics